James Harcourt (27 October 1818 - 1883) was an English organist and composer.

Education

He was apprenticed to Alfred Pettet at St Peter Mancroft in Norwich, and succeeded him in 1851.

He was also Conductor of Norwich Choral Society.

Appointments

Organist of St Stephen's Church, Norwich 1837 - 1839
Organist of St Peter Mancroft 1851 - 1877
Organist of Wymondham Abbey 1880 - 1881

Compositions

Sonata for Violin (or Concertina) and Pianoforte 1861
Andante 1862 
Three Organ Movements 1863

References

1818 births
1883 deaths
English classical organists
British male organists
English composers
Musicians from Norwich
19th-century British composers
19th-century English musicians
19th-century British male musicians
Male classical organists
19th-century organists